Salem Township is one of twelve townships in Steuben County, Indiana, United States. As of the 2010 census, its population was 2,262 and it contained 1,214 housing units.

Geography
Lakes in this township include Big Turkey Lake, Black Lake, Henry Lake, Limekiln Lake, Little Turkey Lake and McClish Lake. The streams of Mud Creek, Mud Creek and Nettle Creek run through this township.

Cities and towns
 Hudson (northwest half)

Unincorporated towns
 Helmer at 
 Lakeside Park at 
 Meadow Shores Park at 
 Salem Center at 
 Turkey Creek at 
 Westview at 
 Wildwood at 
(This list is based on USGS data and may include former settlements.)

Adjacent townships
 Jackson Township (north)
 Pleasant Township (northeast)
 Steuben Township (east)
 Smithfield Township, DeKalb County (southeast)
 Fairfield Township, DeKalb County (south)
 Wayne Township, Noble County (southwest)
 Milford Township, LaGrange County (west)
 Springfield Township, LaGrange County (northwest)

Cemeteries
The township contains six cemeteries: Block, Circle, County Line, Hollister, Trinity and Wright.

Major highways
  Indiana State Road 327

References
 U.S. Board on Geographic Names (GNIS)
 United States Census Bureau cartographic boundary files

External links
 Indiana Township Association
 United Township Association of Indiana

Townships in Steuben County, Indiana
Townships in Indiana